The Sursock Purchase of the Jezreel Valley and Haifa Bay, as well as other parts of Mandatory Palestine, was the largest Jewish land purchase in Palestine during the period of early Jewish immigration.

The Jezreel Valley was considered the most fertile region of Palestine. The Sursock Purchase represented 58% of Jewish land purchases from absentee foreign landlords (as identified in a partial list in a 25 February 1946 memorandum submitted by the Arab Higher Committee to the Anglo-American Committee of Inquiry). The buyers demanded the existing population be relocated and, as a result, the Palestinian Arab tenant farmers were evicted, and approximately 20–25 villages were depopulated. Some of the evicted population received compensation though the buyers were not required under the new British Mandate law to pay. The total amount sold by the Sursocks and their partners represented 22% of all land purchased by Jews in Palestine until 1948, and, as first identified by Arthur Ruppin in 1907, this sale was perceived as vitally important in sustaining the territorial continuity of Jewish settlement in Palestine.

Palestinians' responses to the Sursock Purchase/'Afula incident at the time constitute "one of the earliest cases of organized opposition to Zionist land purchase in Palestine."

Background
Through much of the period of Ottoman rule, the low-lying land of Palestine had suffered from depopulation due to the insalubriousness of conditions on the plains, and the insecurity of life there. This was not peculiar to that region, but rather reflected a general trait also common to all the littoral regions north and south of the Mediterranean.

Zionism's concept of the conquest of labour by Jewish workers meant excluding wherever possible employment of the local Arab workforce.

Sursock purchases from the Ottoman Government
In 1872, the Ottoman Government sold the Jezreel Valley (in Arabic, Marj ibn Amir) to the Sursock family for approximately £20,000. The family went on to acquire more than 400,000 dunams (90,000 acres or 364 km2). These purchases were sustained over a number of years.

According to Frances E. Newton's testimony at the Shaw Commission noted the genesis of the Sursock purchase: "...these lands came into the possession of Sursock through a loan he had made to the Turkish Government. The Turkish Government never had any intention of turning the Arabs off the land, it was more of a sort of mortgage, and Sursock was collecting the tithes interest on his money... Sursock did not become possessed of the lands by virtue of Title Deeds in the original instance. Later Sursock applied to the Government to give him title deeds."

In 1878, Claude Reignier Conder explained as follows:
One curious fact, as showing the infamous condition of the administration, we here also ascertained. A Greek banker named Sursuk, to whom the Government was under obligations, was allowed to buy the northern half of the Great Plain and some of the Nazareth villages for the ridiculously small sum of £20,000 for an extent of seventy square miles; the taxes of the twenty villages amounted to £4000, so that the average income could not be stated at less than £12,000, taking good and bad years together. The cultivation was materially improved under his care, and the property must be immensely valuable, or would be, if the title could be considered secure; but it is highly probable that the Government will again seize the land when it becomes worth while to do so. The peasantry attributed the purchase to Russian intrigue, being convinced that their hated enemy has his eyes greedily turned to Palestine and to Jerusalem as a religious capital, and is ever busy in gaining a footing in the country.

Jewish purchases

Early discussions
In 1891, Yehoshua Hankin, who had immigrated to Palestine from Russia a few years previously, began negotiations to acquire the Jezreel Valley; the negotiations ended when the Ottoman government enacted a prohibition on Jewish immigration.

On 10 March 1897, Theodor Herzl wrote about the Sursock family in his diary, noting the onset of negotiations with the Jewish Colonisation Association for the purchase of 97 villages in Palestine:
The Jewish Colonisation Association is currently negotiating with a Greek family (Soursouk is the name, I think) for the purchase of 97 villages in Palestine. These Greeks live in Paris, have gambled away their money, and wish to sell their real estate (3 % of the entire area of Palestine, according to Bambus) for 7 million francs.

The Zionist Organization considered the Jezreel Valley as the most strategically attractive area to acquire, even more so than the coastal region of Palestine. This is because of the opportunity to carry out large scale agriculture in the area, and the speed at which settlement could be carried out due to the large landowners; in the coastal region smaller parcels of land were available for purchase, and the land was less fertile. The Ottoman government made a number of attempts to limit mass land acquisition and immigration, but these restrictions did not last long due to European pressure under the terms of the capitulations.

1901 Jewish Colonisation Association purchases
In 1901, the Jewish Colonisation Association, having been blocked from land purchases in the Mutasarrifate of Jerusalem, made its first major purchase in the north of Palestine in an acquisition of 31,500 dunums of land near Tiberias from the Sursock family and their partners.

1910–1911 Fula affair

Another of the early Zionist purchases from the Sursocks became known as the "Fula affair" (sometimes erroneously referred to as the "Afula affair," and also called sometimes "the al-Fula incident"). In 1910–11, Elias Sursock sold 10,000 dunums around the village of al-Fula, located at the foot of the Nazareth mountains in Marj Ibn 'Amir, to the Jewish National Fund. The Palestinian peasants refused to leave the land and the qaimaqam (district governor) of Nazareth, Shukri al-Asali fought to overturn the sale, and refused to finalize the transaction.  The villagers themselves sent a petition to the grand vizier complaining of the oppressive use of arbitrary power (tahakkum). In particular, they claimed that Ilyas Sursuk and a middleman had sold their land to people, whom they called 'Zionists' and 'sons of the religion of Moses,' (siyonist musevi) who were not Ottoman subjects, and that the sale would deprive 1,000 villagers of their livelihoods. In earlier petitions concerning lands disputes Jews had been customarily referred to as 'Israelites' (Isra'iliyyun).

The existence of a Saladin-era Crusader castle located within the land area was used to allude to the battle against the Crusaders in opposing the land sale. Palestinians made speeches in opposition in Ottoman Parliament and numerous newspaper articles were published on the subject as well. As put by historian Rashid Khalidi, "the important thing was not whether the ruin had originally been built by Saladin: it was that these newspapers' readers believed that part of the heritage of Saladin, savior of Palestine from the Crusaders, was being sold off (by implication, to the 'new Crusaders') without the Ottoman government lifting a finger."

The political activity against the sale is considered to be “the first concerted action against the growing Zionist activities”, and the sale can be considered "the most significant [Anti-Zionist] event that took place in the period before the outbreak of the First World War."

1918 purchase
The Ottomans had refused to authorize numerous sales, such that the Sursocks were unable to sell significant land to Jewish purchasers prior to World War I. In 1912, the Palestine Land Development Company (PLDC) arranged to purchase a large area in the Jezreel Valley from Nagib and Albert Sursock, but the transaction did not complete due to World War I. On 18 December 1918, the agreement was concluded; it covered 71,356 dunams in the Jezreel Valley, including Tel Adashim.

1921–1925, and depopulation
Following the start of the British Mandate, the Land Transfer Ordinance, 1920, removed all such restrictions. Between 1921 and 1925 the Sursock family sold their 80,000 acres (320 km2) of land in the Vale of Jezreel to the American Zion Commonwealth (AZC) for about nearly three-quarters of a million pounds. The land was purchased by the Jewish organization as part of an effort to resettle Jews who inhabited the land, as well as others who came from distant lands. In 1924 the Palestine Jewish Colonization Association (PICA) was established to take over the role of the Jewish Colonisation Association; PICA became the largest Jewish landowner in Palestine. In parallel, the PLDC acted as the purchasing organization for the Jewish National Fund. The high priority given to these lands owes much to the strategy pursued by Menachem Ussishkin, who found himself opposed by other members of the JNF board. The result of the costly purchase was that much of the organization's capital was tied up for the ensuing decade.

Under the British Mandate, the land laws were rewritten, and the Palestinian farmers in the region were deemed tenant farmers by the British authorities. In the face of local opposition, the right of the Sursocks to sell the land and displace its population was upheld by the authorities. A number of purchased villages, particularly those in the Jezreel Valley, were inhabited by tenants of land who were displaced following the sale. The buyers demanded the existing population be relocated and as a result, the Palestinian Arab tenant farmers were evicted, with some receiving compensation the buyers were not required under the new British Mandate law to pay. Although they were not legally owed any compensation, the evicted tenants (1,746 Arab farmer families comprising 8,730 persons in the largest group of purchases) were compensated with $17 per person.

Despite the sale, some former tenants refused to leave, for example as in Afula. However, the new owners considered it was inappropriate for these farmers to remain as tenants on land intended for Jewish labor, driven in particular by the working-the-land ideology of the Yishuv. British police had to be used to expel some and the dispossessed made their way to the coast to search for new work with most ending up in shanty towns on the edges of Jaffa and Haifa.

The Sursock Purchase became a focus of the 1930 Shaw Commission. Palestinian American Saleem Raji Farah, son of a previous mayor of Nazareth, prepared a detailed table of the Sursock purchases as evidence for the commission showing 1,746 families displaced from 240,000 dunums of land; the information in this table is shown below:

Other villages sold by the Sursocks included:
 Khirbat al-Shuna
 Malhamiyah (became Menahemia)

Jewish settlements
Following the purchase of the land, the Jewish farmers created the first modern-day settlements, founded the modern day city of Afula and drained the swamps to enable further land development of areas that had been uninhabitable for centuries. The country's first moshav, Nahalal, was settled in this valley on 11 September 1921. Moshe Dayan, who grew up in Nahalal, mentioned the moshav – together with three other locations which had been part of the Sursock Purchase – as examples of there being "not one place built in this country which did not have a former Arab population":

References

Bibliography
 

 
 
 
 
 
  
 Schölch, Alexander; 'European Penetration and the Economic Development of Palestine, 1856–82,' in Roger Owen (ed.), Studies in the Economic and Social History of Palestine in the Nineteenth and Twentieth Centuries, Springer, 1982    pp. 10–86 esp pp. 21ff
 
 Sursock House: Rothschild Land Purchases and Early Israel
 

History of Zionism
Jews and Judaism in Ottoman Palestine
Jews and Judaism in Mandatory Palestine
Sursock family